Bagh-e Bahadoran District is a district (bakhsh) in Lenjan County, Isfahan Province, Iran. At the 2006 census, its population was 45,957, in 11,843 families.  The District has two cities: Chermahin and Bagh-e Bahadoran. The District has three rural districts (dehestan): Cham Kuh Rural District, Cham Rud Rural District, and Zirkuh Rural District.

References 

Lenjan County
Districts of Isfahan Province